This list comprises the largest companies in the United States by revenue as of 2022, according to the Fortune 500 tally of companies.

This list includes only publicly traded companies, also including tax inversion companies. There are also corporations having foundation in the United States, such as corporate headquarters, operational headquarters and independent subsidiaries. The list excludes large privately held companies such as Cargill and Koch Industries whose financial data is not necessarily available to the public. However, this list does include several government-sponsored enterprises that were created by acts of Congress and later became publicly traded.

List of the largest companies 
Below are the 100 largest companies by revenue in 2022 (mostly for fiscal year 2021), according to the Fortune 500 list.

List of companies by profit 
The 20 most profitable companies in 2022 according to the Fortune 500.

See also 
 Fortune 500
 List of companies of the United States by state
 List of largest companies by revenue

References 

Economy of the United States-related lists
United states
United States
Lists of companies of the United States
--